Trevor Vusumuzi Ncube is a Zimbabwean entrepreneur and newspaper publisher now living in South Africa and publishing in both countries. As an editor and publisher, he was a critical voice in media of former Zimbabwean President Robert Mugabe and his government.

Personal
Ncube was born in Bulawayo, Zimbabwe. Ncube holds a Bachelor of Arts (Honours) degree in Economic History from the University of Zimbabwe. He was a teacher at Pumula High School in the early 1980s. He then went to work as a journalist, then editor and ultimately news paper publisher by end of the 1990s.

Career
In 1989 Trevor Ncube became assistant editor at The Financial Gazette and was named its executive editor in 1991.

Ncube was the main shareholder of the Mail & Guardian from 2002 until 2017. Trevor Ncube is also the host, producer and  owner of in conversation with Trevor podcast published primarily on YouTube. The podcast is one of Zimbabwe's best podcasts; interviewing different professionals who have made it in their respective fields. Trevor Ncube was part of Emmerson Mnangagwa's advisers after the controversial 2018 so called  second republic. The Mnangagwa administration denied Trevor Ncube a TV license notwithsanding that he was close to Mnangagwa, even having ED's son in  law as  a business partner. He seems to have quitely dropped from the PAC.

He is known for his skepticism or some sort of animosity towards Morgan Tsvangirai, the founding MDC leader and subsequently Nelson Chamisa. He has frequently clashed with Nelson Chamisa's supporters on Twitter. Trevor Ncube has always been an eager proponent of third way, a reference to having another political player other than Zanupf or MDC/ CCC.

Press freedom in Zimbabwe 
On 10 December 2005, Trevor Ncube had his passport taken away by Mugabe's government, in the first application of restrictive press freedom laws. The passport was later returned after the seizure was exposed to be illegal. The government of Zimbabwe tried again, unsuccessfully, to strip him of his citizenship on the basis that his father was born in Zambia. The attempt was seen by many as an attempt to close his newspapers which are highly critical of the government of Zimbabwe's President Mugabe. Zimbabwean law does not allow foreigners to own newspapers. As a result of the political crisis, journalists fled the country, and Ncube moved to South Africa.

SABC blacklist
The South African Broadcasting Corporation blacklisted critics of Mugabe and Zimbabwe's government—a list which included Trevor Ncube. The information came out of a report from a Pretoria-appointed commission of inquiry. Later, a South African court—the South Gauteng High Court—ruled that Snuki Zikalala, SABC managing director, in overseeing the news operation had acted in the interests of South African President Thabo Mbeki and manipulated news about Zimbabwe, including the silencing of critics.

Awards
 1994—Trevor Ncube was named Zimbabwean Editor of the Year.
 2007—International Publishers Association Freedom Prize Award
 2008—German Africa Award. The German Africa Foundation presented Ncube for his dedication for press freedom, human rights and democracy in Zimbabwe and the whole of Southern Africa.
 2010—Kenya Nation Media Group Life Achievement Award
 2012—MISA Press Freedom Award. The Media Institute of Southern Africa awarded Ncube its annual award "for his role in providing Zimbabweans with alternative platforms for critical, alternative views on social, economic and political issues."
Ncube was cited as one of the Top 100 most influential Africans by New African magazine in 2014.

References

1962 births
Living people
People from Bulawayo
Zimbabwean businesspeople
Zimbabwean journalists
Zimbabwean expatriates in South Africa
Zimbabwean exiles
Zimbabwean educators
University of Zimbabwe alumni
20th-century Zimbabwean writers
21st-century Zimbabwean writers